Miroslav Vajs or Miroslav Weiss (born 27 July 1979) is a retired footballer from the Republic of Macedonia. He played for Macedonian powerhouse Vardar Skopje and has appeared for the Macedonia national football team.

International career
He made his senior debut for Macedonia in a March 2002 friendly match against Bosnia and Herzegovina and has earned a total of 9 caps, scoring no goals. His final international was an August 2008 friendly against Luxembourg.

Achievements
FK Rabotnicki
Macedonian First League: 3
Winner: 2004–05, 2005–06, 2007–08
Macedonian Football Cup: 1
Winner: 2007–08

FK Metalurg Skopje
Macedonian Football Cup: 1
Winner: 2010–11

FK Vardar
Macedonian First Football League: 2
Winner: 2011–12, 2012–13

References

External links
Profile at Macedonian Football 

1979 births
Living people
Footballers from Skopje
Association football defenders
Macedonian footballers
North Macedonia international footballers
HNK Hajduk Split players
HNK Rijeka players
Hapoel Be'er Sheva F.C. players
FK Rabotnički players
FK Vardar players
FK Metalurg Skopje players
Macedonian First Football League players
Croatian Football League players
Israeli Premier League players
Macedonian expatriate footballers
Expatriate footballers in Croatia
Macedonian expatriate sportspeople in Croatia
Expatriate footballers in Israel
Macedonian expatriate sportspeople in Israel